Păun (meaning "peacock") may refer to:

Păun, a village in Mihălăşeni Commune, Botoşani County, Romania
Păun, a village in Bârnova Commune, Iaşi County, Romania
Păun (surname), Romanian
Romanian given name
Păun Otiman